Roman Bezrukavnikov (born 1973) is an American mathematician born in Moscow. He is a mathematics professor at the Massachusetts Institute of Technology and the chief research fellow at the HSE International Laboratory of Representation Theory and Mathematical Physics who specializes in representation theory and algebraic geometry.

He graduated from Moscow State School 57 mathematical class in 1990, and earned an M.A. at Brandeis University in 1994.  He received his Ph.D. in mathematics from Tel Aviv University in 1998 under the supervision of Joseph N. Bernstein.

Bezrukavnikov was a visiting scholar at the Institute for Advanced Study in 1996-1998 and again in 2007–2008. He was a Dickson Instructor at the University of Chicago in 1999-2001. In 2001 he was awarded a Clay Research Fellowship, and in 2004, he won a Sloan Research Fellowship from the Alfred P. Sloan Foundation.  He was awarded a Simons Fellowship in Mathematics by the Simons Foundation in 2014, and again in 2020.

References

External links
 
Faculty page at Massachusetts Institute of Technology

1973 births
Living people
21st-century American mathematicians
Brandeis University alumni
Tel Aviv University alumni
Massachusetts Institute of Technology School of Science faculty
Institute for Advanced Study visiting scholars